Uluberia Uttar Assembly constituency is an assembly constituency in Howrah district in the Indian state of West Bengal. It is reserved for scheduled castes.

Overview
As per orders of the Delimitation Commission, No. 177 Uluberia Uttar Assembly constituency  (SC) is composed of the following: Amta, Bhandargachha, Chandrapur, Khardah, Raspur, Sirajbati, Udang I and Udang II gram panchayats of Amta I community development block and Baniban, Basudevpur, Joyargori, Tehatta Kantaberia I, Tehatta Kantaberia II and Tulsiberia gram panchayats of Uluberia II community development bloc.

Uluberia Uttar Assembly constituency is part of No. 26 Uluberia (Lok Sabha constituency).

Members of Legislative Assembly

Election results

2021

2016

2011

 

.# Swing calculated on Congress+Trinamool Congress vote percentages taken together in 2006.

1977-2006
In the 2006 and 2001 state assembly elections Mohan Mondal of CPI(M) won the Uluberia North assembly seat defeating Gopal Dolui and Ram Janam Majhi, both of Trinamool Congress, respectively. Contests in most years were multi cornered but only winners and runners are being mentioned. Ram Janam Majhi representing Congress defeated Asta Das of CPI(M) in 1996. Raj Kumar Mondal of CPI(M) defeated Gunakar Sinha of Congress in 1991, Gobinda Sinha of Congress in 1987, Gunakar Singh of Congress in 1982, and Arun Pramnik of Janata Party in 1977.

1951-1972
Raj Kumar Mandal of CPI(M) won in 1972 and 1971. Kalipada Mondal of Forward Bloc won in 1969. A.L. Majumdar of Forward Bloc won in 1967. Bejoy Bhusan Mondal of Forward Bloc won in 1962. In 1957 and 1951 Uluberia had a double seat. Abani Kumar Basu of Congress and Bijoy Bhusan Mondal of Forward Bloc won in 1957. Bijoy Mondal and Bibhuti Bhusan Ghosh, both of All India Forward Bloc (Ruikar) won in 1951.

References

Assembly constituencies of West Bengal
Politics of Howrah district
1952 establishments in West Bengal
Constituencies established in 1952